Gem'X was a 1991 puzzle game for the Amiga, Commodore 64 and Atari ST platforms from game developer Kaiko GmbH. The player is presented with two rectangular grids of coloured gems, the left grid is changeable and the right grid is static. The aim is to click on gems on the left grid to make it look exactly like the right grid. The challenge comes from the fact that clicking on a gem to change its colour also causes the four adjacent gems to change colour.

The game music was written by Chris Huelsbeck.

Gem'X originally caused special interest because of the various anime-style beautiful young women shown between levels, in very skimpy clothing, although their intimate parts aren't shown until the final picture for completing the game.

1991 video games
Amiga games
Atari ST games
Commodore 64 games
Puzzle video games
Video games scored by Chris Huelsbeck
Video games developed in Germany